Astenois (Latin pagus Stadunensis) was a pagus, the most basic division of territory in the Roman and Frankish empires. In the Middle Ages, it comprised the parishes of the deaconries of Sainte-Menehould and Possesse. Originally a part of Lotharingia, by the eleventh century its southern part belonged to the Holy Roman Empire and its northern part to the Kingdom of France. The original seat of its counts was at Le Vieil-Dampierre.

Traditionally, Astenois, Dormois and Castrice, the three eastern pagi of the archdiocese of Reims were held to belong to the empire. In the eleventh century, as part of a general fragmentation of power in the region, new counties were formed which did not correspond to ancient pagi but were instead named after their main castles. The county of Astenois, which did correspond to an old pagus, became known as the county of Dampierre after its rulers' chief fortress.

The counts of Astenois were originally a cadet branch of the counts of Toul. The county was produced through the division of the patrimony of Frederick II. The elder son, Renard III, received Toul, while the younger, Peter, received Astenois.

Astenois may originally have been a small fief of the bishops of Toul. It may have passed from the last count of the old line, Renard II, to the first count of the new, Frederick I, through the marriage of the latter to the former's daughter, Gertrude, at the same time as the bishop made Frederick count of Toul (1059). Frederick and Gertrude's son, Frederick II, then divided the patrimony for his sons.

List of counts and lords
Peter
Frederick
Henry
Renard I
Renard II
Renard III
Renard IV
Anselm I
Anselm II
John I
John II

Notes

Bibliography

Vol. 1 (1889), pp. 177–191
Vol. 2 (1890), pp. 801–807
Vol. 3 (1891), pp. 691–699

Subdivisions of the Holy Roman Empire
Medieval France